This is a list of notable alumni of Pacific Union College, a highly ranked private liberal arts college in California's Napa Valley.

Pacific Union College has produced a large number of distinguished alumni for a school of its size. It has been noted for being the "training ground for an inordinately large number of outstanding physicians, dentists, nurses, teachers and theologians" who make up part of its over 50,000 alumni. PUC's notable alumni include members of the United States Congress and California State Assembly; a Harlem Renaissance poet, a professional smooth jazz saxophonist, and others in the arts; multiple presidents of the World Seventh-day Adventist Church, judges, the founder of the Loma Linda University Medical Center, Adventist Health Glendale; presidents of many institutions of higher education including the University of Houston, La Sierra University and others; among the alumni also numerous scientists, professors, television personalities and even a surgeon in the Japanese Imperial Army.

Alumni

References

San Francisco Bay Area-related lists
Lists of people by university or college in California